Burgstall is a municipality in the Börde district in Saxony-Anhalt, Germany. On 1 January 2010 it absorbed the former municipalities Cröchern, Dolle and Sandbeiendorf. The municipality consists of the Ortsteile (municipal divisions) Blätz, Burgstall, Cröchern, Dolle and Sandbeiendorf.

Between 1345 and 1562, Burgstall was owned by the Bismarck family.

References

Municipalities in Saxony-Anhalt
Börde (district)